Louw is a surname that has pre-7th century Germanic origins. It is a Dutch/Flemish variant on the word Löwe, meaning Lion.

People

Give name
 Louw de Graaf (1930–2020), Dutch politician 
 Louw Venter (born 1975), South African actor and filmmaker
 Louw Wepener (1812–1865), Cape Colony Military

Surname
Aimee Louw, Canadian disabled activist
Antoinette Louw (born 1975), South African actress
Andrew Louw (politician), South African politician
Andrew Louw (cricketer) (born 1987), Namibian cricketer
Boy Louw (1906–1988), South African rugby union player
Dewald Louw (born 1986), South African singer
Eric Louw (1890–1968), South African diplomat and politician
Francois Louw (born 1985), South African rugby union player
Gene Louw (born 1931), South African politician
Gretta Louw (born 1981), South African-Australian artist and curator
Hanrie Louw (born 2001,  South African field hockey player
James Louw (born 1971), English cricketer
Japie Louw (1867–1936), South African rugby union player
Johann Louw (born 1979), South African cricketer
Lennie Louw (born 1959), South African-born Namibian cricketer
Miel Louw, Belgian journalist, television presenter, and writer
N. P. van Wyk Louw (1906–1970), South African poet, playwright, and scholar
Rob Louw (born 1955), South African rugby union player
Robbie Louw (born 1992), South African rugby union player (son of Rob Louw)
Roxy Louw (born 1987), South African model, actress, and surfer (daughter of Rob Louw)
Rudi Louw (born 1985), Namibian footballer
Stéfan Louw (born 1973), South African lyric tenor
Stephan Louw (born 1975), Namibian long jumper
Tiaan Louw (born 1988), Namibian cricketer
W. E. G. Louw (1913–1980), South African poet
Willem Louw (1920–1980), South African military commander
Wynand Louw (born 1961), Namibian cricket umpire

References

Afrikaans-language surnames
Dutch-language surnames
Surnames of Dutch origin